Essich is a region of Scotland located between Inverness and Loch Ness. It is located 2.7 kilometres from the centre of Inverness and is serviced by Holm Primary School.

Populated places in Inverness committee area